Halakere  is a village in the Gajendragada taluk of Gadag district in the Indian state of Karnataka. Halakere is famous for Sri Annadaneshawara Mutt. Halakere is Southeast to the taluka Place Gajendragada.

Demographics
 India census, Halakere had a population of 3,816 with 1,860 males and 1,956 females and 747 Households.

See also
Naregal
Gajendragad

References

Villages in Gadag district